William Sandys ( – December 1669), known as Waterworks Sandys, was an English politician. He was MP for Evesham in three Parliaments from 1640 until 1669. During the English Civil War he lived as an exile in France, procuring arms for the Royalist cause. He was a notable waterworks engineer, who improved the River Avon and the River Wye, and who was involved in various ways in several other river navigation schemes.

Sandys family
William Sandys was born at Fladbury, Worcestershire, the second son of Sir William Sandys (later also of Miserden, Gloucestershire) and his second wife Margaret, daughter of Walter Culpeper. Sandys was the younger brother of Sir Miles Sandys , the grandson of Miles Sandys , and the great-nephew of Edwin Sandys, Archbishop of York.

Sandys is sometimes confused with two of his cousins, William Sandys nicknamed Golden Sandys (son of Sandys' uncle Sir Edwin Sandys ) and William Sandys of Ombersley (son of Sir Samuel Sandys , son of Archbishop Sandys). All three were at Oxford at a similar time. The nickname Waterworks Sandys distinguishes the subject of this article from Golden Sandys and Sandys of Ombersley.

Biography
Sandys entered Gloucester Hall, Oxford in 1623, aged 16 – matriculating at Oxford on 13 June 1623, the same day as his cousin William Sandys of Ombersley. He entered the Middle Temple as a student in 1626.

He left London in 1633 to live at Fladbury with his new wife Cicely, daughter of Sir John Stede, with whom he received a handsome portion.  They settled at Fladbury, where the lease of the manor (under the Bishop of Worcester) was settled on them.

In 1635, supported by petitions from many towns and from the counties affected, Sandys was authorised by Order in Council and Letters Patent, (in 1636),/ to improve the river Avon.  Within a few years, he had made the river navigable at least to Stratford upon Avon, and possibly beyond.  This was done by constructing 'sluices', which seem to have been pound locks (not flash locks − as often supposed).  The navigation was complete to Stratford by 1640, but its cost had stretched his resources.  He had had to mortgage his estates and the navigation, and these passed into the hands of his creditors.

Sandys also had a patent to farm a new duty imposed by the king (without Parliamentary sanction) on coal exports.  This project was a failure and he surrendered the grant, but the fact that he had taken it at all was later held against him. In 1640 he represented Evesham in the Short Parliament. He was re-elected for the same constituency in the Long Parliament, but was expelled as a monopolist. Not long after he went into exile.

During the English Civil War he acted as a Royalist agent purchasing munitions at Dunkirk. Later he travelled trying to raise money to finance the restoration of Charles as king.  He was a supernumerary gentleman-usher at the exiled court, but was discouraged from attendance.

After the Restoration, Sandys represented Evesham in Cavalier Parliament and was a particularly active member for the rest of his life.  His interests included the promotion of navigation schemes.  He attempted to recover the river Avon, but his claim was probably bought out.  He and Windsor Sandys (probably his son rather than his great nephew) improved the River Wye up to Mordiford (the confluence of the River Lugg), partly using finance raised for the purpose during the Interregnum, but this evidently did not pay its expenses and the river was eventually surrendered to the county.  He and Windsor were also partners in the River Wey Navigation in Surrey, but the nature of their interest (eventually sold by Windsor Sandys) is not clear.  In all, he was concerned in about seven schemes, but most did not pass the initial hurdle of an Act of Parliament being passed.

Due to his loss of his estates and his inability to profit from the Avon, Sandys had little property at his death in December 1669, apart from his navigation interests.

Family
On 24 April 1633 Sandys married Cicely, daughter of Sir John Stede. After his death Cicely had difficulty in recovering the interest (as jointure in the manor of Fladbury, which she thought she had retained under arrangements made in the 1630s.

Note
 Alumni Oxonienses confuses the two, wrongly identifying William Sandys of Ombersley, not Waterworks Sandys, as MP for Evesham.

References

Sources

Further reading
 

cf. 

|-

|-

1607 births
1669 deaths
English civil engineers
Engineers from Worcestershire
Gentlemen Ushers
Alumni of Gloucester Hall, Oxford
17th-century English engineers
River Wye
English MPs 1640 (April)
English MPs 1640–1648
English MPs 1661–1679
Politicians from Worcestershire
Cavaliers
People from Wychavon (district)